Phog can refer to:

 Kahului Airport (ICAO airport code: PHOG)
Calligonum polygonoides, a desert shrub
Phog Allen, American basketball coach
 profoundly hidden outweighing goods defense (PHOG), a solution to the problem of evil

See also

 Fog (disambiguation)